Gaeru may refer to:

Dokonjō Gaeru (Gutsy Frog) a manga/anime
Alternative spelling for Gyeru (Gyeh-ru/Gyeh-Ru)
Gaeru of Baekje - Historical Korean king